Franco Soldati (born 30 September 1959 in Udine) is an Italian Commercial director who has been serving as Executive President of Italian football club Udinese Calcio since 1999.

References

Living people
1950 births
People from Udine